FAD reductase (NADH) (NADH-FAD reductase, NADH-dependent FAD reductase) is an enzyme with systematic name FADH2:NAD+ oxidoreductase. This enzyme catalyses the following chemical reaction

 FADH2 + NAD+  FAD + NADH + H+

The enzyme from Burkholderia phenoliruptrix has a preference for FAD.

References

External links 
 

EC 1.5.1